Lelean Memorial School is one of the largest co-ed schools in Fiji. It was established in 1943 and is run by the Methodist Church of Fiji and Rotuma. It is co-located at the Davuilevu Methodist Compound with the Davuilevu Theological College and the Young People's Department, which runs training for Methodist catechists.

Overlooking Fiji's largest river, the Rewa, the school gate faces the Rewa Bridge that was funded by the European Union and opened in 2006. Directly across the river is the village of Nausori and the old sugar town of the same name. The school roll for 2021 is 1,240. Lelean Memorial School caters for students in the Tailevu, Naitasiri and Rewa provinces but it also accepts those who apply from other parts of Fiji.

History
In late 1942, the Pacific Campaign of World War II was at its peak and the Colonial Authority was issued a command that all urban schools should close and surrender their compounds for use as military camps for forces fighting the Japanese threat. At that time, William Ewart Donnelly, a missionary teacher from New Zealand, was principal of Toorak Boys’ School or the Suva Methodist Boys' School — renamed the Suva Methodist Primary School in the 1970s or 1980s.  Donnelly served as a teacher and General Secretary of the Students’ Christian Movement in the early 1930s and early 1940s and remained principal of Lelean from 1943 to 1945, when he returned to New Zealand.

Other overseas teachers immediately left Fiji to await the end of the war elsewhere. But Donnelly, the determined missionary principal, sent a circular to all members of the senior classes of Classes Six, Seven, and Eight of Toorak Boys School, inviting volunteers to accompany him to continue their education. After consultation with the heads of the Methodist Church, he received permission to use the Principal's residence at the Davuilevu Technical School, in Nausori.

As a result, he and 50 volunteers from Toorak Boys School, met at the Principal's residence 3 March 1943. Their first classrooms were the two master bedrooms with the long verandah on the east side of the structure serving as the library. There were only two classes and the only teacher in addition to Donnelly was Semesa Sikivou.

During the 1943 Methodist Church Annual Conference, Donnelly received permission to expand his school along the same ridge and as a result, the boys themselves, with his guidance, built three large bures, where the teachers staff quarters presently stand.  The conference also directed him to name the new facility Lelean Memorial School in memory of the Reverend Charles Oswald Lelean, an Australian missionary who served in Fiji for 36 years.  For 20 of those years, 1914 to 1934, Rev. Lelean held the position of Senior Superintendent of the Davuilevu Mission and principal of the Methodist Theological College.

Under Donnelly's guidance, the Lelean school created its motto, “Seek wisdom and spiritual understanding”.

List of Principals at Lelean
 1943-45					W.E Donnelly
 1945-48					S.G Andrews
 1953					F.A Crane
 1954-59					R.S Udy
 1959-69					R.L Northcott
 1970					Ms P.Furnival
 1971					W.E Donnelly
 1971-73					T.G.M Spooner
 1974-76					N.Rika
 1976-79					S.Finau
 1980-82					P.Tiqatabua
 1983					Mrs M.Koroi
 1984					N.Rika
 1985-86					Rev A.Daunakamakama
 1986-88					N.Rika
 1988-89					A.Daunakamakama
 1989-90					P.Sotutu
 1991-92					J.Nabuka
 1993					A.R Rarokoliwa
 1993-96					A.D Racule
 1997-99					S Vadiga
 2000–2013 Rev A.R Rarokoliwa
 2013-16               Rev Ledua Colati
 2017-2019             Laisa Kalidole Soko
 2020-Current          Mohammed Feroz

Houses of Lelean

The houses of Lelean are named in honour of one Tongan and three Fijian missionaries. When the Lelean Memorial School was established, the houses had not yet been given names but were numbered Houses One, Two, Three and Four. In 1948, the Davuilevu Council named the houses after Joeli Bulu, Ilaijia Varani, Sailasa Naucukidi and Josua Mateinaniu. The names honour Fiji's local missionary effort amongst her own population as well its contribution to international Christian growth. The house colours, ethos and mottoes are:

 Naucukidi – Green - Spirit Of Christian Responsibility; Motto: Sacrifice for GOD's glory
 Bulu – Blue - Spirit Of Christian Pioneering; Motto: To live among the stars
 Varani – Yellow/Gold - Spirit Of Christian Leadership; Excellence in Leadership
 Mateinaniu – Red - Spirit Of Christian Service: Service to man, is service to GOD

Sports
Lelean has won the coveted Deans Trophy for the FSSRU Under-19 competition, 13 times and drawn five times since it entered the competition in the mid-1940s. It was the first school to have won all the Fiji Secondary Schools' Rugby Union (FSSRU) Competition trophies on offer in 1952. That record has since been equalled by Ratu Kadavulevu School in the 2017 FSSRU Competition. Lelean last held the Deans Trophy in 2014. Their previous victory in the Fiji secondary schools' competition was in 2010 after winning the Deans finals for the third consecutive year since 2008. Lelean also takes part in athletics, netball, soccer, hockey and cricket. The Fiji Rugby Union has established a High Performance Gymnasium at the school's Rugby Academy which is also used by the Tailevu Rugby Union,  Naitasiri and Rewa Rugby Unions.

School Battle Cry
The school battle cry is Feed the Bulbul. This slogan is unique to Lelean Memorial School. It was coined in the late 1940s to the early 1950s and has been around since then. As boarders in Lelean in the 1950s, students always foraged for food in their free time. This search for food included eeling (hunting for eels), catching prawns, fishing, diving for fresh water mussels (kai), mongoose trapping, hunting chickens that strayed onto the school compound, trapping bulbuls (pycnonotus jocosus fuscicaudatus), and hunting bats. The junior boys in particular were the ones who always venturesome in trapping bulbuls.  In setting the trap, this group would close all the dining hall windows and doors, except for the door facing the double storey dormitories. These dorms are now part of the Rugby Academy and Technical Drawing facilities.

To lure in the bulbul, food crumbs would be spread out from just outside the open door to the middle of the dining hall. The group would then go and lie in wait from a nearby vantage point.  When the agreed signal was given by the hunt leader, the group would then rush in and lock themselves in the Dining Hall with the trapped birds. The birds were then hunted down for the kill, with balled-up towels used as missiles.

It became a game sport for young Lelean boarders but the kill was also destined for the pot.  The derivation of “Feed the Bulbul” is from this foraging sport.  In rugby, the Lelean students would practice set moves, on the basis of luring in an opponent into a trap upon which bodies were launched much like 'human torpedoes' with deadly accuracy against opposing teams. The code word for these moves was “Feed the Bulbul”.

Feed the Bulbul evolved from a rugby code to become the school battle cry, especially in full-contact sports such as Rugby Union and Rugby league.

Notable alumni

Academia
 Dr Rusiate Nayacakalou - first Pacific Islander to graduate with a PhD
 Dr Epeli Hau'ofa - late former head of the Department of Sociology, University of the South Pacific, and Founder/Director of the Oceania Centre for Arts and Culture,
 Dr Tupeni Baba
 Dr Jimione Samisoni - late former Dean of the Fiji School of Medicine,
 Dr Ropate Qalo (Head of School, School of Social and Economic Development, University of the South Pacific)
 Dr Matakite Maata (Head of Chemistry Division, University of the South Pacific)
 Dr PauI RaIifo (Nuclear Magnetic Resonance instrumentation specialist
at Boston University)
 Rev Dr Jovili Iliesa Meo - Principal of the Pacific Theological College, 1996-2001-first native Fijian Church Minister to graduate with a PhD
 Dr Isimeli Waibuta Tagicakiverata] 
 Dr Isimeli Cokanasiga
 Dr Romila Devi Gopalan, Lecturer in Organic Chemistry, University of the South Pacific
 Dr Nacanieli Rika, Lecturer, School of Accounting and Finance, University of the South Pacific

Armed Forces
 Warrant Officer Ratu Meli Vesikula - Regimental Sergeant Major, Duke of Wellington's Regiment (West Riding) King's Division, 
 Staff Sergeant Sotia Ponijiasi - 22 Squadron British SAS then NZ Army SAS, (Later Captain in the Republic of Fiji Military Forces)
 Sergeant Ilisoni Ligairi - 22 Squadron British SAS (Later Major in the Republic of Fiji Military Forces)
Colonel, Isoa Delamisi Tikoca, CM, MSD. Former Chief Military Observer in Somalia (UNOSOM) & Rwanda (UNAMIR). Colonel UNations Military Advisor in Tanzania, Rwanda, Zaire & Burundi. Former Commanding Officer HQ RFMF & Former Commanding Officer, RFMF Engineers.
 Commander Timoci Lesikivatukoula Natuva -Minister of Works in the Fiji Military Regime,
 Lieutenant Colonel Viliame Seruvakula - former Commanding Officer, 3rd Battalion, Fiji Infantry Regiment,
 Lieutenant Colonel Isireli Dakunimata - former Commanding Officer, Logistic Support Unit
 Lieutenant Colonel Etueni Caucau - former Director Army Legal Services,
 Captain Sainivalati S. Navoti - Legal Counsel

Civil service
 Jioji Kotobalavu - former Permanent Secretary to the Prime Minister, later CEO, Prime Minister's Office,)
 Mary Chapman - former Secretary to the House of Representatives.
 Ratu Isoa Delamisi Tikoca, Deputy Permanent Secretary, Ministry for Fijian Affairs, Commissioner Central Division, Commissioner Western Division.
 Mosese Nailumu, Director of Roads & Bridges, Ministry of Works.
 Taina Tagicakibau, Permanent Secretary Public Service Commission, Permanent Secretary, Ministry of Local Government,
 Late Ratu Eliki Tikoidraubuta, Provincial Administrator for the Districts of Lomaiviti and Macuata, later Divisional Planning Officer - North.

Clergy
 Rev Paula Niukula - former President of the Methodist Church of Fiji and Rotuma,
 Rev Tomasi Kanailagi - former President of the Methodist Church of Fiji and Rotuma
 Rev Dr Akuila Yabaki - Director of the Citizens' Constitutional Forum, a prominent Civil Rights organisation in Fiji,
 Rev Dr Jovili Iliesa Meo - Principal of the Pacific Theological College, 1996-2001.

Diplomatic Corp
 Paula Sotutu - former Fiji Permanent Representative to the UN
 Sailosi Kepa (Former High Commissioner to Great Britain)
 Pita Kewa Nacuva - former Ambassador to USA and Canada
 Viliame Navoka - (Late former Consul General, Sydney, Australia 1993 to 1996)
 Joji Kotobalavu - former Ambassador to Japan,
 Ratu Isoa Delamisi Tikoca CM, MSD. Former High Commissioner to Papua New Guinea, Vanuatu, Solomon Is, East Timor, 2004 to 2009.
 Seru Savou Kuliniasi - former First Secretary, Fiji High Commission, Wellington, NZ,
 Mere Tora - current Acting High Commissioner, Fiji High Commission, Wellington, NZ
 Sainivalati S. Navoti - former First Secretary/Legal Counsel, Fiji Mission to the UN, New York 2004 -2008, President, International Seabed Authority (ISBA), 2006, Anti Terrorism Advisor (Pacific), UNODC, Lead Negotiator for Climate Change, Alliance of Small Island States (AOSIS), G77 & China Lead Negotiator 2013, Senior Legal Counsel- International Seabed Authority, Kingston, Jamaica, 2014 - Senior Legal Advisor Int'l Seabed Authority, Kingston, Jamaica

Education
 Joeli Nabuka
 Kolinio Rainima Meo (former Permanent Secretary (CEO) Fiji Ministry of Education) (former Director/CEO Fiji Institute of Technology
 Alumeci Susu Tuisawau - Director CAS/TVET, Ministry of Education.
 Saimoni Waibuta - Director Assets Management Unit, Ministry of Education

Fiji Police Force
 Aisea Taoka
 Emosi Nakete Meo (Former Director – Fiji Police Special Branch)

Law
 Late former Attorney-General (SVT Government) Kelemedi Bulewa 
 Late former Attorney-General (SVT Government) Ratu Etuate Tavai,
 Former Justice Kishore Govind,
 Former Justice Sailosi Kepa,
 Former Magistrate Josaia Waqaivolavola - youngest Magistrate in Fiji but was removed by the military regime of Frank Bainimarama.
 Late Former Small Claims Tribunal Referee Tomasi Mucunabitu
 Former General Manager of the iTaukei Land Trust Board (formerly the Native Land Trust Board) - Alipate Qetaki

Medicine

 Dr Samuela Kata,
 Dr Alipate Jimi Pareti
 Dr Jimione Samisoni,
 Dr Salesi Savou,
 Dr Lepani Ditoka,
 Dr Deo Edwin Narayan,
 Dr Apimeleki James Meo,
 Dr Amrita Kumar
 Dr Ravin Chandar
 Dr Anare Sailo
 Dr Joji Savou

Politics
 Ati George Sokomanu - first President of the Republic of Vanuatu,
 Tomasi Vakatora - Late former Speaker of the Fiji House of Representatives and one of the architects of the 1997 Constitution of Fiji,
 Dr Apenisa Kuruisaqila - Late former Speaker of the House of Representatives,
 Lloyd Maepeza Gina - first Speaker of the National Parliament of the Solomon Islands - 1976,
 Ratu Etuate Tavai - late Attorney General in the history of Fiji,
 Pita Kewa Nacuva - Former Speaker of the House of Representatives)
 Viliame Navoka- Late Senator and Fiji Consul General to Sydney.
 Tupeni Baba - Founding Member or Fiji Labour Party, Founder of the New Labour Party, Founding Member of SODELPA Party
 Mitieli Bulanauca - Former Senator in the Soqosoqo Duavata ni Lewenivanua Government,
 Joeli Nabuka - Late Member of Parliament in the Soqosoqo Duavata ni Lewenivanua Government,
 Jokapeci Koroi (nee Cavu) - Late Founding Member and later President of the Fiji Labour Party.
 Ratu Isoa Delamisi Tikoca Member of Parliament, SODELPA Party Opposition Chief Whip.
 Jone Usamate, Minister for Employment Opportunities, Productivity and Industrial Relations, Fiji First Government
 Semi Koroilavesau, Minister for Fisheries, Fiji First Government
 Ratu Sela Nanovo, Opposition Member, SODELPA Party
 Netani Rika, Government Backbencher, Fiji First Government
 Timoci Lesikivatukoula Natuva, Former Minister for Defence, Fiji First Government

Prisons service
 Aisea Taoka (Commissioner of Prisons)

Tourism and Hospitality
 Radike Qereqeretabua - First Fiji local to be Director of Shangri La's Fijian Resort and Spa

Trade unions
 Ted Young

Athletics
 Ana Ramacake Birch - gold medalist at the South Pacific Games, 1963,
 Mosese Waqainabete – 4 × 400 m Gold Medalist 1979 SPG,
 Jone Veikoso – 4 × 400 m Gold Medalist 1979 SPG,
 Makelesi Bulikiobo, Gold Medallist SPG 2003, 2005 - 100m, 200m, 400m, 4 X 100m
 Mesulame Rokuro – discus, Olympic Games, Commonwealth Games and South Pacific Games in the 1950s and 1960s.

Cricket
 Joeli Nabuka
 Joe Rika
 Saiasi Fuli

Rugby
 Autiko Daunakamakama Snr
 Akapusi Qera
 Alipate Ratini
 Apisai Domolailai
 Apolosi Satala
 Dale Tonawai
 Emosi Mulevoro
 Fero Lasagavibau
 Isikeli Vuruna
 Isireli Nasiganiyavi
 Iliesa Keresoni
 Joe Ravouvou
 Joseva Nayacavou - Scotland
 Josua Vici
 Kameli Ratuvou
 Mosese Nailumu
 Metuisela Talebula
 Manasa Saulo
 Napolioni Nalaga
 Pita Nacuva
 Peni Rokodiva
 Ravai Fatiaki
 Saula Radidi
 Sailosi Kepa
 Sireli Naqelevuki
 Seta Tamanivalu - New Zealand
 Seremaia Bai
 Tevita Kuridrani - Australia
 Tomasi Mawi
 Waisale Serevi
 Waisea Daveta
 Eroni Mawi
Peni Matawalu

Rugby League
Suliasi Vunivalu - Melbourne Storm

Judo
 Josateki Naulu

Soccer
 Marika Rodu
 Simione Tamanisau

Netball
 Matila Waqanidrola
Vilisi Tavui
Alesi Waqa

References

 Colin George, History, Australian Defence Force Academy, UNSW. Awarded by, University of New South Wales – Australian Defence Force Academy. School of History, 2000. Raicakacaka,'walking the road' from colonial to post-colonial mission, the life, work and thought of the Reverend Dr. Alan Richard Tippett, Methodist missionary in Fiji, anthropologist and missiologist, 1911-1988.
 Garret, John, To live among the stars, Institute of the Pacific Studies; 1985
 Tippett, A.R., 1954, The Christian (Fiji 1835–1867), Auckland Institute and Museum, Auckland
 Baleiwaqa, Tevita, 1996, ‘Josua Mateinaniu/Ko Josua Mateinaniu’, in Thornley and Vulaono 1996:20–30
 Kanailagi, Tomasi, 1996, ‘The Life and Work of Rev John Hunt/Ko Jione Oniti’, in Thornley and Vulaono 1996.
 Meo, Jovili, 1966, ‘Methodist Education/Na Vuli e na Lotu Wesele’, in Thornley and Vulaono 1996:160–76.
 Thornley, Andrew, and Tauga Vulaono, 1996, Mai Kea Ki Vei: Stories of Methodism in Fiji and Rotuma, 1835–1995, Methodist Church of Fiji and Rotuma.
 Lelean Makes Deans History, Fiji Times 22 Aug 2010, Lelean makes Dean history
 A New Chapter at 74, Fiji Times, 28 Jan 2012, Radike Qereqeretabua
 Lelean Sings the Blues, Fiji Times, 24 August 2009
 , Melbourne Storm, 20 February 2015

Educational institutions established in 1942
Methodist Church of Fiji and Rotuma educational institutions
Schools in Fiji
1942 establishments in Fiji